Ali Shido Abdi Omar was a senior Somali politician and elder. He was one of the earliest members of the Somali Youth League in Somalia, and eventually became that political party's vice chairman. He was also first Somali ambassador to France and also served as Somali ambassador to Saudi Arabia.

Year of birth missing
Year of death missing
Somali Youth League politicians